The Holliday-Segar formula is a formula to help approximate water and caloric loss (and therefore the water requirements) using a patient's body weight. Primarily aimed at pediatric patients, the Holliday-Segar formula is the most commonly used estimate of daily caloric requirements. To date, the formula continues to be recommended in the current clinical practice guidelines of the American Academy of Pediatrics, American Society of Parenteral and Enteral Nutrition, and National Health Service. Developed in 1957 by Drs. Malcolm A. Holliday and William E. Segar while at the Indiana University School of Medicine, the researchers concluded a non-linear relationship between energy expenditure and weight alone to determine fluid requirements.

Worked example 
To estimate the daily fluid requirements of a 9-year-old boy who weights 32 kg, 10*100 + 10*50 + 12*20 = 1740 kcal per day. At a 1 kcal / 1 mL conversion, the daily H20 requirements would therefore be 1740 mL.

Limitations 
While generalizable to most cohorts, the Holliday-Segar formula may inadequately estimate caloric requirements in patients affected by fever, hypothermia, or increased activity states (i.e., hyperthyroidism or status epilepticus). The formula can also only be applied to patients above 2 weeks of age.

References 

Nutrition